Jan Eriksson may refer to:
 Jan Eriksson (footballer, born 1962)
 Jan Eriksson (footballer, born 1967)
 Jan Eriksson (ice hockey)

See also
 Jan Ericson, Swedish politician